Smiljan may refer to:

 Smiljan, Croatia, a village near Gospić
 Smiljan, South Slavic masculine given name
 Smiljan Pavič (born 1980), Slovenian basketball player
 Smiljan Radic (born 1965), Chilean architect of Croatian heritage
 Smiljan Rozman (1927–2007), Slovene writer
 Smilyan, a village near Smolyan, Bulgaria

See also
 Smilja
 Smiljanić
 Miljan